Jaakko Antti Mattila (born 30 July 1976) is a Finnish abstract painter.

Mattila was born in Oulu, and graduated from The Surrey Institute of Art & Design University College in 2001. Since then his works have been displayed in Finland, the United Kingdom, Italy and France and he has made public works.

Mattila is interested in the fundamental elements that create our sense, or illusion, of the world. Nature is his biggest single inspiration. He is also interested in the constructive principles of the universe such as infinity, smallness, greatness and time. Among his paintings he has made sculptures, installations and art furniture. Mattila currently lives and works in Finland.

He is a member of the Finnish Painters Union, Oulu Artist Organisation and artist group CollectEast.

Public works 
Pallautuneet-sculpture, traffic signs, steel, polyurethane paint, Nallikari Camping, Hietasaari, Oulu, 2005
 Mural (with Petri Yrjölä), Club 45 Special, Oulu, 2006
A Detail of the Cosmos (45 remix), acrylic, Club 45 Special, Oulu, 2007

Literature 
 Jaakko Mattila: Teoksia 2003-2008, Kalevaprint, 2008,

References

External links 
Jaakko Mattila website 
Oulu Art Museum: Pallautuneet 
Suomen Kuvataiteilijat -verkkomatrikkeli: Jaakko Mattila 
Saatchi Gallery: Jaakko Mattila 
Helsingin taiteilijaseura: Jaakko Mattila
Jaakko Mattila at MySpace 

1976 births
Contemporary painters
Finnish installation artists
20th-century Finnish painters
21st-century Finnish painters
21st-century male artists
Living people
People from Oulu
Finnish male painters
20th-century Finnish male artists